Hermeuptychia atalanta is a species of butterfly in the family Nymphalidae. It was described by Arthur Gardiner Butler in 1867. It is found in Venezuela.

References

Butterflies described in 1867
Euptychiina
Nymphalidae of South America
Taxa named by Arthur Gardiner Butler